John L. Gannon is an American attorney and politician serving as a member of the Idaho House of Representatives from the 17A district. Elected in 2012, he previously represented the same district from 1990 to 1992.

Early life and education
Gannon was born in Ross, California. He earned a Bachelor of Arts degree from the University of California, Davis and a Juris Doctor from the University of California, Hastings College of the Law.

Elections
1992: Gannon originally won the seat in the November 6, 1990, general election.
1994: Gannon was unopposed (and therefore not listed) in the May 24, 1994, Democratic primary, but lost the November 3, 1992, general election to Republican Jesse Berain, who held the seat from 1994 until 1998.
2002: Gannon ran for the district's B seat in the May 28, 2002, Democratic primary but lost; Berain had also run but lost to Janet Miller, who held that seat from 2002 until 2006.
2012: when Democratic Representative William Killen retired, Gannon filed for election and was unopposed for the 2012 Democratic primary election, and won with 1,306 votes. Gannon won the three-way November 6, 2012, general election with 8,959 votes (56.6%) against Republican nominee Kreed Kleinkopf and Independent candidate Gus Voss.

References

External links
John Gannon at the Idaho Legislature
Campaign site
 

Year of birth missing (living people)
Living people
Democratic Party members of the Idaho House of Representatives
People from Boise, Idaho
People from Ross, California
University of California, Davis alumni
University of California, Hastings College of the Law alumni
21st-century American politicians